Nicole Levandusky (born May 17, 1979) is a former professional basketball player for the Los Angeles Sparks of the Women's National Basketball Association. She then served as coach of Notre Dame Academy.

Honors and awards

High school
Palmerton Area High School (1993-1997) scored 2,662 career points

College
Atlantic 10's Defensive Player of the Year (2001)
2x First-team all-conference selection

WNBA
2001 WNBA champion

Xavier statistics

Source

References

External links
Nicole Levandusky WNBA stats | Basketball-Reference.com

1979 births
Living people
Los Angeles Sparks draft picks
Los Angeles Sparks players
Xavier Musketeers women's basketball players